Pine Knob and Pineknob may refer to:

Pine Knob, a ski area in Michigan
Pine Knob (Pennsylvania), a peak in the Allegheny Mountains
Pineknob, West Virginia, an unincorporated community in Raleigh County
Pine Knob, Wisconsin, an unincorporated community in Crawford County